Patrick Leugueun (born 25 February 1981 in Yaoundé) is a Cameroonian former professional footballer who played as a defender. With the exception of a half-year stint with Cypriot side AEL Limassol he spent all of his career in France, making over 100 appearances in Ligue 2.

His brother Serge Leugueun is also a footballer, but never played on a professional level.

Honours
Vannes
 Coupe de la Ligue: runner-up 2008–09

References

External links
 
 

1982 births
Living people
French footballers
Association football defenders
Cameroonian footballers
Cameroonian expatriate footballers
Expatriate footballers in France
FC Girondins de Bordeaux players
Cameroonian expatriate sportspeople in France
FC Istres players
En Avant Guingamp players
Vannes OC players
AEL Limassol players
Stade Bordelais (football) players
Ligue 1 players
Ligue 2 players
Championnat National players
Cypriot First Division players
Expatriate footballers in Cyprus